The Mayotte drongo (Dicrurus waldenii) is a species of bird in the family Dicruridae.
It is endemic to Mayotte.

Its natural habitats are subtropical or tropical moist lowland forest, subtropical or tropical mangrove forest, subtropical or tropical moist shrubland, and plantations.
It is threatened by habitat loss.

References

Birds of Mayotte
Drongos
Birds described in 1866
Taxonomy articles created by Polbot
Endemic fauna of Mayotte